A Public Scientific and Technical Research Establishment (EPST) is a category of public research institutes. In France, they were authorized by Law No. 82-610 of 15 July 1982. In Algeria, they were authorized by decree No. 99-256 of 16 November 1999.

List of EPST in France
 Institut national de recherche en sciences et technologies pour l'environnement et l'agriculture (IRSTEA, also formerly known as Cemagref)
 Centre national de la recherche scientifique (CNRS)
 Institut national d'études démographiques (INED)
 Institut national de recherche agronomique (INRA)
 Institut de recherche pour le développement (IRD, ex-ORSTOM)
 Institut français des sciences et technologies des transports, de l'aménagement et des réseaux (IFSTTAR)
 Institut national de la santé et de la recherche médicale (INSERM)
 National Institute for Research in Computer Science and Control (INRIA)

Former EPST 
 Institut national de recherche sur les transports et leur sécurité (INRETS)
 Laboratoire central des ponts et chaussées (LCPC)

Research 
A research collaboration between an EPST and a university laboratory is called a mixed research unit (Unité mixte de recherche or UMR).

List of EPST in Algeria
National Centre of Research in Social and Cultural Anthropology

External links 
 list of main French research centers on the French research ministry website .

Science and technology in France